Vas proceus is a moth of the family Erebidae first described by Michael Fibiger in 2010. It is known from northern Vietnam.

The wingspan is about 13 mm. The head, patagia, tegulae, thorax, and ground colour of the forewing are brown, while the narrow costal patch of the medial and terminal area are dark brown. The forewing is long and narrow, with a pointed apex. The crosslines are all present, though indistinctly marked. The terminal line is marked by black interneural dots. The hindwing is light grey, with an indistinct discal spot. The underside of the forewing is brown grey and the underside of the hindwing is light grey, with a discal spot.

References

Micronoctuini
Moths described in 2010
Taxa named by Michael Fibiger